Mohamed Abbou ( – born 1 January 1959, Bni-Oulid near Taounate) is a Moroccan politician of the National Rally of Independents. Between 2007 and 2010, he held the position of Minister-Delegate for Public Service and the Modernization of the Administration in the cabinet of Abbas El Fassi. He was dismissed from this position because of a feud with the "Wali" (governor) of Taza-Al Hoceima-Taounate.

See also
Cabinet of Morocco

References

Government ministers of Morocco
1959 births
Living people
Moroccan engineers
People from Taounate
Moroccan businesspeople
University of the Mediterranean alumni
20th-century Moroccan people
21st-century Moroccan people
National Rally of Independents politicians